Nicola Luche (born 22 April 1998) is an Italian football player. He plays as a forward.

Club career

FeralpiSalò 
On 31 July 2016, Luche made his professional debut for FeralpiSalò as a starter in a 3–2 home defeat after extra-time in the first round of Coppa Italia, he was replaced by Medin Murati in the 70th minute. On 27 August 2016 he made his debut in Serie C as a substitute replacing Simone Guerra in the 70th minute of a 3–1 away defeat against Santarcangelo. On 13 September he scored his first professional goal, as a substitute, in the 73rd minute of a 3–2 home win over Lumezzane. On 26 March 2017 he played his first entire match for FeralpiSalò, a 2–0 away defeat against Maceratese.

Career statistics

Club

References

External links 

 Nicola Luche at Soccerway

1998 births
FeralpiSalò players
Italian footballers
Footballers from Brescia
Association football forwards
Living people